Wallingford station is a SEPTA Regional Rail station in Wallingford, Pennsylvania. Located at Kershaw Road and Possum Hollow Road, it serves the Media/Wawa Line. In 2017, this station saw 280 boardings and 287 alightings on an average weekday. It is in Nether Providence Township.

The station was established by the Pennsylvania Railroad. In 1855, when the rail line was extended to Media through Wallingford, passing and freight sidings were built at the location. The present station was built in 1890 (although some sources claim it was built in 1880). While the identity of the station's architect has not been proven, some secondary sources claim it was designed by architect Frank Furness. For a time, this station also served as Wallingford's post office.

Station layout
Wallingford has two low-level side platforms with a connecting pathway across the tracks.

References

External links

SEPTA - Wallingford Station
Original Wallingford PRR Station
 Station House & Station from Google Maps Street View

SEPTA Regional Rail stations
Stations on the West Chester Line
Former Pennsylvania Railroad stations
Frank Furness buildings